David Michael Wojnarowicz (  (September 14, 1954 – July 22, 1992) was an American painter, photographer, writer, filmmaker, performance artist, songwriter/recording artist, and AIDS activist prominent in the East Village art scene. He incorporated personal narratives influenced by his struggle with AIDS as well as his political activism in his art until his death from the disease in 1992.

Biography
Wojnarowicz was born in Red Bank, New Jersey, where he and his two siblings and sometimes their mother were physically abused by their father, Ed Wojnarowicz. Ed, a Polish-American merchant marine from Detroit, had met and married Dolores McGuinness in Sydney, Australia, in 1948 when he was 26 and she was 16. After his parents' bitter divorce, he moved to New York as a teenager with his young mother, Australian-born Dolores. During his teenage years in Manhattan, Wojnarowicz worked as a street hustler around Times Square. He graduated from the High School of Music & Art in Manhattan. By 1971, at age 17, Wojnarowicz was living on the streets full time, sleeping in halfway houses and squats.

After a period outside New York, Wojnarowicz returned in the late 1970s and emerged as one of the most prominent and prolific members of an avant-garde wing that used mixed media as well as graffiti and street art. His first recognition came from stencils of houses afire that appeared on the exposed sides of East Village buildings.

Wojnarowicz made super-8 films such as Heroin and Beautiful People with Jesse Hultberg, completed a 1977–1979 photographic series on Arthur Rimbaud, did stencil work and collaborated with the band 3 Teens Kill 4, which released the independent EP No Motive in 1982. He exhibited his work in well-known East Village galleries and New York City landmarks, notably Civilian Warfare Gallery, Ground Zero Gallery NY, Public Illumination Picture Gallery, Gracie Mansion Gallery, and Hal Bromm Gallery.

Wojnarowicz was also connected to other prolific artists of the time, appearing in or collaborating on works with Nan Goldin, Peter Hujar, Luis Frangella, Karen Finley, Kiki Smith, Richard Kern, James Romberger, Marguerite Van Cook, Ben Neill, Marion Scemama, and Phil Zwickler. In 1987 his longtime mentor and lover, the photographer Hujar, died of AIDS, and Wojnarowicz himself learned that he was HIV-positive. Hujar's death moved Wojnarowicz to create much more explicit activism and political content, notably about the injustices, social and legal, in the response to the AIDS epidemic. He collaborated with video artist Tom Rubnitz on the short film Listen to This (1992), a critique of the Reagan and Bush administrations' homophobic responses and failure to address the crisis. The film was shown at MoMA's 2017-18 exhibit Club 57: Film, Performance, and Art in the East Village, 1978–1983.

In 1985, Wojnarowicz was included in the Whitney Biennial's so-called Graffiti Show. In the 1990s, he sued and obtained an injunction against Donald Wildmon and the American Family Association on the grounds that Wojnarowicz's work had been copied and distorted in violation of the New York Artists' Authorship Rights Act.

Wojnarowicz's works include Untitled (One Day This Kid...), Untitled (Buffalo), Water, Birth of Language II, Untitled (Shark), Untitled (Peter Hujar), Tuna, Peter Hujar Dreaming/Yukio Mishima: St. Sebastian, Delta Towels, True Myth (Domino Sugar), Something From Sleep II, Untitled (Face in Dirt), and I Feel a Vague Nausea.

Wojnarowicz also wrote several successful books, many about political and social issues relating to the AIDS epidemic. One of his bestsellers, Close to the Knives: A Memoir of Disintegration, is an autobiography discussing topics such as his troubled childhood, becoming a renowned artist in New York City, and his AIDS diagnosis. Knives opens with an essay about his homeless years: a boy in glasses selling his skinny body to the pedophiles and creeps who hung around Times Square. The heart of Knives is the title essay, which deals with the sickness and death of Hujar, Wojnarowicz's lover, best friend and mentor, "my brother, my father, my emotional link to the world". In the final essay, "The Suicide of a Guy Who Once Built an Elaborate Shrine Over a Mouse Hole", Wojnarowicz investigates the suicide of a friend, mixing his own reflections with interviews with members of their shared circle. In 1989, Wojnarowicz appeared in Rosa von Praunheim's widely acclaimed film Silence = Death about gay artists in New York City fighting for the rights of AIDS sufferers.

Wojnarowicz died in his Manhattan home on July 22, 1992 at the age of 37, from what his boyfriend, Tom Rauffenbart, confirmed was AIDS. After his death, photographer and artist Zoe Leonard, a friend of Wojnarowicz, exhibited a work inspired by him, Strange Fruit (for David).

Legacy

A Fire in My Belly controversy
In November 2010, after consultation with National Portrait Gallery director Martin Sullivan and co-curator David C. Ward but not co-curator Jonathan David Katz,  Smithsonian Institution Secretary G. Wayne Clough removed an edited version of footage used in Wojnarowicz's short silent film A Fire in My Belly from the exhibit "Hide/Seek: Difference and Desire in American Portraiture" at the National Portrait Gallery in response to complaints from the Catholic League, U.S. House Minority Leader John Boehner, Representative Eric Cantor and the possibility of reduced federal funding for the Smithsonian. The video contains a scene with a crucifix covered in ants. William Donohue of the Catholic League claimed the work was "hate speech" against Catholics. Gay historian Jonathan Ned Katz wrote:

Response from Clough and Smithsonian
Clough later said that although he stood by his decision, it "might have been made too quickly", and called the decision "painful." He said that because of the controversy surrounding the footage and the possibility that it might "spiral out of control", the Smithsonian might have been forced to shut down the entire "Hide/Seek" exhibition, and that was "something he didn't want to happen." The "Hide/Seek" exhibition "examined representations of homosexuality in American portraiture", and Clough said, "The funders and people who were upset by the decision—and I respect that—still have an appreciation that this exhibition is up. We were willing to take this topic on when others were not, and people appreciate that."

Clough added, "But looking back, sure, I wish I had taken more time. We have a lot of friends who felt left out. We needed to spend more time letting our friends know where this was going. I regret that."

The video work was shown intact when Hide/Seek moved to the Tacoma Art Museum.

Response from the art world and the public
The curator David C. Ward defended the artwork, saying, "It is not anti-religion or sacrilegious. It is a powerful use of imagery".

In response, The Andy Warhol Foundation, which had provided a $100,000 grant to the exhibition, announced that it would not fund future Smithsonian projects, while several institutions, including the San Francisco Museum of Modern Art and the Tate Modern, scheduled showings of the removed work.

On December 2, 2010, protesters against the censorship marched from the Transformer Gallery to the National Portrait Gallery. The work was projected on the building. On December 5, activists Michael Blasenstein and Michael Dax Iacovone were detained and barred from the gallery for holding leaflets.

On December 9, National Portrait Gallery Commissioner James T. Bartlett resigned in protest. The artist AA Bronson sought to withdraw his art from the exhibit, with support from the lending institution, the National Gallery of Canada, but was unsuccessful. The curators appeared at a forum at the New York Public Library. A protest was held from the Metropolitan Museum of Art to the Cooper Hewitt Museum.

On December 15, a panel discussion was held at the Museum of Fine Arts, Houston. On December 20, a panel discussion was held at the Washington, D.C. Jewish Community Center. On January 20, 2011, the Center of Study of Political Graphics held a protest at the Los Angeles Museum of Contemporary Art.

Clough issued a statement standing by the decision, spoke at a Town Hall Los Angeles meeting, and appeared at a public forum on April 26–27, 2011.

Several Smithsonian curators criticized the decision, as did critics, with Newsweek arts critic Blake Gopnik going so far as to call the complaints "gay bashing" and not a legitimate public controversy.

Notable posthumous exhibitions
In 2011, P.P.O.W. gallery showed Spirituality, an exhibition of Wojnarowicz's drawings, photographs, videos, collages, and personal notebooks; in a review in The Brooklyn Rail, Kara L. Rooney called the show "meticulously researched and commendably curated from a wide array of sources, ... a mini-retrospective, providing context and clues for Wojnarowicz's often elusive, sometimes dangerous, and always brutally honest work."

In 2018, the Whitney Museum of American Art hosted a major retrospective, David Wojnarowicz: History Keeps Me Awake at Night, which was co-curated by the Whitney's David Kiehl and art historian David Breslin. It received international praise.

Influence
In 1992, the band U2 used Wojnarowicz's tumbling buffalo photograph "Untitled (Buffaloes)" for the cover art of its single "One". The band further adapted this imagery during its Zoo TV Tour. The single and subsequent album became multi-platinum over the next few years, and the band donated a large portion of its earnings to AIDS charities. An oversized gelatin print of "Untitled (Buffaloes)" sold at auction in October 2014 for $125,000, more than four times the estimated price.

In 1988, Wojnarowicz wore a leather jacket with the pink triangle and the text: "If I die of aids - forget burial - just drop my body on the steps of the F.D.A.". In his 1991 memoir Close to the Knives, Wojnarowicz imagined "what it would be like if, each time a lover, friend or stranger died of this disease, their friends, lovers or neighbors would take the dead body and drive with it in a car a hundred miles an hour to Washington DC and blast through the gates of the White House and come to a screeching halt before the entrance and dump their lifeless form on the front steps." On October 11, 1992, activist David Robinson received wide media attention when he dumped the ashes of his partner, Warren Krause, on the grounds of the White House as a protest against President George H. W. Bush's inaction in fighting AIDS. Robinson reported that his action was inspired by this text in Close to the Knives. In 1996, Wojnarowicz's own ashes were scattered on the White House lawn.

His name appears in the lyrics of the Le Tigre song "Hot Topic." Weight of the Earth, the transcription of Wojnarowicz's audio journals, inspired Mega Bog's album Life, and Another, and gives its name to the song "Weight of the Earth, on Paper".

On September 13, 2021 at the Met Gala in New York City the Canadian actor Dan Levy wore an outfit by designer Jonathan Anderson for Loewe which prominently featured an adapted version of Wojnarowicz's artwork F--- You F----- F----- depicting 
two men kissing while shaped as maps, with the support of the visual artist's estate.

Collective exhibitions
A list of Wojnarowicz's group exhibitions the year prior to his death.

1991

 The Figure in the Landscape, Baumgartner Galleries, February, Washington, DC
 From Desire...A Queer Diary, curated by Nan Goldin, Richard F. Brush Art Gallery Canton, NY
 Whitney Biennial, The Whitney Museum of American Art, New York, NY
 The Art of Advocacy, The Aldrich Museum of Contemporary Art, Ridgefield, CT
 Hands Off!, The New School for Social Research, New York, NY
 Tableaux Du SIDA, Foundation Deutsch, Belmont-Sur-Lausanne, France
 The Third Rail, curated by Karin Bravin, John Post Lee Gallery, New York, NY
 Compassion and Protest: Recent Social and Political Art from the Eli Broad Family Foundation Collection, San Jose Museum of Art, San Jose, CA
 American Narrative Painting and Sculpture: The 1980s, Nassau County Museum of Art, Roslyn, NY
 Cruciformed: Images of the Cross since 1980, curated by David Rubin, Cleveland Center for Contemporary Art, Cleveland, OH
 Social Sculpture, curated by Steven Harvey and Elyse Cheney, Vrej Baghoomian Gallery, New York, NY
 The Interrupted Life, New Museum, New York, NY
 Outrageous Desire: The Politics and Aesthetics of Representation in Recent Works by Lesbian and Gay Artists, Rutgers University, Mason Gross School of the Arts, New Brunswick, NJ
 Art of the 1980s: Selections from the Collection of Eli Broad Foundation, Duke University Museum of Art, Durham, NC
 Domenikos Theotokopoulos-A Dialogue, Philippe Briet Gallery, New York, NY
 Fuel, curated by Jay Younger, The Institute of Modern Art, Brisbane, Australia; The Australia Centre for Photography, Sydney, Australia; The Australian Centre for Contemporary Art, Melbourne, Australia

Books
 Sounds in the Distance. (1982). Aloes Books.
 Tongues of Flame. (Exhibition Catalog). (1990). Illinois State University.
 Close to the Knives: A Memoir of Disintegration. (1991). Vintage Books.
 Memories That Smell Like Gasoline. (1992). Artspace Books.
 Seven Miles a Second. (Collaborative graphic novel with James Romberger and Marguerite Van Cook, completed posthumously). (1996). Vertigo/DC Comics.
 The Waterfront Journals. (1997). Grove/Atlantic.
 Rimbaud In New York 1978–1979. (Edited by Andrew Roth). (2004). Roth Horowitz, LLC/PPP Editions.
 In the Shadow of the American Dream: The Diaries of David Wojnarowicz. (Amy Scholder, editor). (2000). Grove/Atlantic.
 Willie World. (Illustrator; written by Maggie J. Dubris). (1998). C U Z Editions.
 Weight of the Earth: The Tape Journals of David Wojnarowicz. (Lisa Darms and David O'Neill, editors). (2018). MIT Press.

Films

Directed by Wojnarowicz
 Fire in my Belly – filmed in Mexico and New York in 1986 and 1987, no soundtrack
 Beautiful People – filmed in New York City in 1987, no soundtrack

About Wojnarowicz
 Post Cards from America (1994) – a non-linear biography of Wojnarowicz (Steve McLean, director)
Wojnarowicz: F**k You F*ggot F**ker (2021) – biographical documentary

Music
 3 Teens Kill 4 EP No Motive 1982
 Cross Country 3 x LP Reading Group 2018

Critical studies and adaptations
 Blinderman, Barry ed. David Wojnarowicz : Tongues of Flame, 1990, 
 Close to the Knives. (1993) AIDS Positive Underground Theatre. John Roman Baker.
 David Wojnarowicz: Brush Fires in the Social Landscape. (1995). Aperture.
 Wojnarowicz, David, et al., ed. Amy Scholder. Fever: The Art of David Wojnarowicz. (1999). New Museum Books.
David Wojnarowicz : A Definitive History of Five or Six Years on the Lower East Side, interviews by Sylvère Lotringer, edited by Giancarlo Ambrosino (2006).
Carr, Cynthia Fire in the Belly The Life and Times of David Wojnarowicz (2012) St Martin's Press. 
Laing, Olivia The Lonely City: Adventures in the Art of Being Alone (2016) Canongate

Archival collections
The David Wojnarowicz Papers are at the Fales Library at New York University. The Fales Library also houses the papers of John Hall, a high school friend of Wojnarowicz. The papers include a small collection of letters from Wojnarowicz to Hall.

See also
 Joel Wachs, head of Andy Warhol Foundation, protested removal of Wojnarowicz piece

References

External links
P.P.O.W Gallery New York, Estate of David Wojnarowicz
NYU's Fales Library and Special Collections Guide to the David Wojnarowicz Papers
NYU's Fales Library and Special Collections Guide to the John Hall Papers-contain letters from Wojnarowicz
David Wojnarowicz by Dan Cameron and Dennis Szakacs
David Wojnarowicz Reading
David Wojnarowicz & Doug Bressler: (1984) "American Dreamtime" published at Tellus Audio Cassette Magazine
NYU's Fales Library and Special Collections Guide to the David Wojnarowicz—Janine Pommy-Vega Letters
Huffington Post analysis of the Smithsonian Wojnarowicz controversy*
David Wojnarowicz Journals: Years Ago Before the Nation went Bankrupt
David Wojnarowicz (1954–1992) ubu.com
"Outlaw Documentary:David Wojnarowicz's Queer Cinematics, Kinerotics, Autothanatographics" by Dianne Chisholm. Canadian Review of Contemporary Literature 21.1 & 2, 1994
David Wojnarowicz Knowledge Base

1954 births
1992 deaths
AIDS-related deaths in New York (state)
20th-century American memoirists
20th-century American painters
20th-century American male artists
American male painters
Artists from New York (state)
American contemporary painters
American gay artists
American gay writers
Gay memoirists
LGBT people from New Jersey
Postmodernists
Lambda Literary Award winners
American people of Australian descent
American people of Polish descent
Fiorello H. LaGuardia High School alumni
20th-century American printmakers
People from Red Bank, New Jersey
American LGBT photographers
20th-century American LGBT people
HIV/AIDS activists